Naming rights are a financial transaction and form of advertising or memorialization whereby a corporation, person, or other entity purchases the right to name a facility, object, location, program, or event, typically for a defined period of time.  For properties such as multi-purpose arenas, performing arts venues, or sports fields, the term ranges from three to 20 years.  Longer terms are more common for higher profile venues such as professional sports facilities.

The distinctive characteristic for this type of naming rights is that the buyer gets a marketing property to promote products and services, promote customer retention and/or increase market share.

There are several forms of corporate sponsored names. For example, a presenting sponsor attaches the name of the corporation or brand at the end (or, sometimes, beginning) of a generic, usually traditional, name (e.g. Mall of America Field at Hubert H. Humphrey Metrodome); or, a title sponsor replaces the original name of the property with a corporate-sponsored one, with no reference to the previous name.

Stadium naming
Stadium naming may have shifted in recent years to promoting corporate trade names, but in earlier decades is largely traced to the family names of company founders.

The record for the highest amount paid for naming rights belongs to Scotiabank Arena. On August 29, 2017, a 20-year, CAD$800 million sponsorship deal was reached between Maple Leaf Sports and Entertainment and Canada's Bank of Nova Scotia to rename Toronto's Air Canada Centre. The home of the NHL's Toronto Maple Leafs and NBA's Toronto Raptors became known as Scotiabank Arena on July 1, 2018. 

Prior to the Scotiabank Arena deal, the record belonged to Citi Field (opened in 2009) and Barclays Center (opened in 2012), both located in New York City, US. Each garnered deals of USD$20 million per year for at least 20 years.

The New Meadowlands Stadium, shared home of the New York Giants and New York Jets in East Rutherford, New Jersey, US, was expected to eclipse both deals, with experts estimating it would value US$25–30 million annually. It ultimately fell short of that benchmark, with MetLife Stadium earning $17 million annually from its naming rights deal with MetLife.

Occasionally, the purchaser of a stadium's naming rights may choose to donate those rights to an outside organization, typically one to which it is closely related. Probably the most notable example of this is Friends Arena, a major stadium in Stockholm. The facility was originally known as Swedbank Arena, but in 2012 that company donated those rights to the Friends Foundation, an organization heavily sponsored by Swedbank that seeking to combat school bullying. More recently, the Kentucky Farm Bureau, an organization promoting the interests of Kentucky farmers that is best known to the non-farming public for its insurance business, acquired the naming rights to the University of Kentucky's new baseball park in 2018. The Farm Bureau in turn donated those naming rights to the Kentucky Department of Agriculture, naming the venue Kentucky Proud Park. The sponsored name is the brand used by said state agency in its marketing campaign for agricultural products produced in that state.

In the United States

Naming rights in United States may have been traced back to 1912 with the opening of Fenway Park in Boston. The stadium's owner had owned a realty company called "Fenway Realty" (itself named for a nearby parkland), so the promotional value of the naming has been considered. Despite this, it is more widely believed to have begun in 1926 when William Wrigley, the chewing gum magnate and owner of the Chicago Cubs, named his team's stadium "Wrigley Field". In 1953, Anheuser-Busch head and St. Louis Cardinals owner August Busch, Jr. proposed renaming Sportsman's Park, occupied by the Cardinals, "Budweiser Stadium".  When this idea was rejected by Ford Frick, the Commissioner of Baseball at that time, Anheuser-Busch then proposed the title "Busch Stadium" after one of the company's founders.  The name was readily approved, and Anheuser-Busch subsequently released a new product called "Busch Bavarian Beer" (now known as Busch Beer). The name would later be shifted to the Busch Memorial Stadium in 1966, shortened in the 1970s to "Busch Stadium" and remained the stadium's name until it closed in 2005. By that time, Major League Baseball's policy had changed – with Coors Field in Denver and Miller Park in Milwaukee going up in that span – and Anheuser-Busch (who retained the naming rights after selling the team) was able to use the same name for the Cardinals' new stadium which opened on April 4, 2006.  Foxboro Stadium, the home of the New England Patriots between 1970 and 2001, was an early example of a team selling naming rights to a company that did not own it, naming the stadium Schaefer Stadium after the beer company from its erection until 1983.

The public reaction to this practice is mixed. Naming rights sold to new venues have largely been accepted, especially if the buyer is well-established and has strong local connections to the area, such as the cases of Rich Stadium (now Highmark BlueCross BlueShield Stadium) in the Buffalo suburb of Orchard Park, Heinz Field in Pittsburgh, and Coors Field in Denver.  Selling the naming rights to an already-existing venue has been notably less successful, as in the attempt to rename Candlestick Park in San Francisco to 3Com Park.  The general public (and some media outlets) continued to call the facility what it had been known as for over three decades – i.e. Candlestick Park. After the agreement with 3Com expired, the rights were resold to Monster Cable, and the stadium was renamed Monster Park. San Francisco voters responded by passing an initiative (Proposition H) in the November 2004 elections that essentially stipulated the name must revert to Candlestick Park once the contract with Monster expired in 2008. The initiative proved largely ceremonial, however, and it was overturned by the passage of Proposition C in 2009 in response to desperate economic times. The naming rights to the park were never resold and the stadium closed in 2014.

Outside the United States
Sports stadiums with naming rights deals are not limited to the United States. "Named" stadiums can be found in countries including Australia, Japan, China, Finland, Canada, Israel and Germany, where 8 of the 10 largest football stadiums have their naming rights sold to corporate sponsors.  The practice is widening in the United Kingdom; for instance the current stadium of Bolton Wanderers is the University of Bolton Stadium (after 17 years as Reebok Stadium and 4 as Macron Stadium) and Arsenal Football Club's stadium (opened for the 2006/2007 season) is the Emirates Stadium, their previous ground being Arsenal Stadium. In cricket, the most famous example is The Oval, home of Surrey County Cricket Club. It has had several sponsors over the years, and is currently known as "The Kia Oval", having originally been known as the "Kennington Oval", after the district of London in which it is located.

Other examples 

While the highest prices have traditionally been paid for stadium rights, many companies and individuals have found that selling their naming rights can be an important consideration in funding their business. In the last few years many new categories have opened up, such as the selling of the rights to name a new monkey species for $650,000.

Public transit
Naming rights to public transit stations have been sold in Las Vegas and Philadelphia (NRG station, Jefferson Station, and Penn Medicine station). Such sales have been contemplated in New York and Boston, and ruled out in San Francisco.  A sponsorship for the MBTA's State Street station by Citizens Bank lasted from 1997 to 2000.  In Tampa, naming rights for both streetcar stations and rolling stock are available.

In December 2016, the Los Angeles County Metropolitan Transportation Authority approved a naming rights policy for its facilities and routes, but later rescinded the policy two months later over potential lawsuits for skipping sponsors.

A couple of examples outside of the United States would be the on Madrid Metro where the metro line Line 2 and the station Sol was renamed from 2013 to 2016 after the mobile phone operator Vodafone,  and  Monumento Station in the Manila Light Rail Transit System in the Philippines, which was renamed Yamaha Monumento Station on February 14, 2018, after renovations.

Sports

Naming rights in the realm of sports is common for both stadiums and sports competitions and series. In addition, some sports teams adopt a name of the sponsor as their team or club name (see List of sports clubs named after a sponsor).

Competitions
In association football, leagues and cup competitions sometimes adopt the name of their sponsors. For example, England's Premier League was known as the Barclays Premier League until 2016, and its FA Cup is officially the Emirates FA Cup. The Premier League announced in 2015 that it would not accept a title sponsorship beginning in the 2016–17 season. Since 2020, the French Professional Football Ligue adopted the name of Ligue 1 Uber Eats.

In college football, all of the Division I bowl games have either modified or abandoned their traditional names in favor of title sponsors. While most include the traditional name in some form (e.g., Capital One Orange Bowl, The Rose Bowl Game presented by Northwestern Mutual), there have been bowl games that have totally eliminated their traditional name in favor of solely using a corporate sponsor's name in an effort to dissuade fans from using a generic name (for instance, the former Tangerine Bowl is now the Camping World Bowl, and the Gator Bowl was for a time known as the TaxSlayer Bowl), a move that generally is treated with consternation from fans.

Team names and even whole leagues have occasionally been sold to corporate sponsors as well (examples include the New York Red Bulls in the former case, the NET10 Wireless Arena Football League for the latter), but this is generally rare in the United States and more common in other parts of the world.

During the 1980s, sanctioned auto races in NASCAR and IndyCar began to abandon their traditional names in favor of exclusive sponsor names. The trend expanded rapidly in NASCAR such that in 1991, all 29 races in the Winston Cup Series featured sponsor names (including the Daytona 500, which was given a presenting sponsor as the Daytona 500 by STP), with little or no reference to the original names. As of the 2010s, very few exceptions remain in NASCAR (such as the Daytona 500, which no longer uses the presenting sponsor), and typically races without sponsor names only lack them because a suitable sponsor could not be secured in enough time. IndyCar follows suit, with most races (except the very traditional Indianapolis 500) embracing title sponsorship. Sports media coverage (such as ESPN news reports) typically refer to races by the town in which the home race track is held, avoiding the use of sponsored names in news coverage.

Media
Television and radio series, especially in the early days of each medium, frequently sold the naming rights to their programs to sponsors, most of whom bankrolled the program; examples include The Fleischmann's Yeast Hour, Texaco Star Theatre and The Philco Television Playhouse. This form of sponsorship fell out of favor in the late 1950s.

Unofficial naming rights
The International Star Registry is a commercial company that since 1979 has sold unofficial naming rights to stars (i.e., the astronomical objects).  The naming services are limited to an entry in a book, and carry no scientific or official authenticity according to professional astronomers.

Social connotations 
In some places, and especially in the UK and United States, the naming or renaming of arenas or events is usually met with disapproval from the general public. Some people see it as an example of a selling out, especially when they see no obvious benefit to themselves. They often refuse to use a new name, preferring instead to use a non-branded name, especially in colloquial situations. Rebranding can also lead to confusion. In such cases, there may be a lengthy period during which the property is known by both names. A common example is Willis Tower in Chicago which was and often still is referred to as the "Sears Tower", even though the building was sold some time ago.

Sporting events such as the FIFA World Cup, UEFA Euro, Olympic Games and the Paralympic Games prohibit the use of corporate-sponsored name on stadiums, construing the practice as a form of ambush marketing. Any stadium that uses a corporate-purchased name must always be referred to in all event-related media (including live broadcasts) by a generic name (e.g., General Motors Place was referred to as "Canada Hockey Place" during the 2010 Winter Olympics). On the other hand, Toyota Stadium was referred to as "City of Toyota Stadium" during the 2019 Rugby World Cup to avoid confusion as a form of ambush marketing, although the stadium is not named after Toyota Motor Corporation, but the name of the city in which the stadium is located. The regular corporate signage of a site, including billboards and deck advertising, is usually covered up in these cases; in the FIFA case the signage is replaced solely with FIFA sponsors. However, with the near-universal use of LED ribbon boards, scoreboards, and sideline boardings since the mid-2000s in most major league sites where only known sponsors have advertising displayed, "neutralizing" an arena has become a much easier process than in the past.

Regina, Saskatchewan's REAL District was formerly named "Evraz Place"; when discussing its 2022 rebranding, its owner Regina Exhibition Association Limited stated that it had sometimes received shipments and communications meant for the Evraz steel company – mistakenly believing that the company's North American division was based there.

Nonprofit usage 
A nonprofit organization has the option to recognize a major gift from a donor by bestowing naming rights to a property in recognition of the financial support.  This is not a financial transaction in the style of the private sector. For example, in honor of the more than $60 million donated over the years by one donor to the National Air and Space Museum properties, the directors of the Smithsonian Institution chose to name its satellite facility in Loudoun County, Virginia, after the donor, calling it the Steven F. Udvar-Hazy Center.

Walgreen Coast, a portion of the coast of Antarctica, was so named because the Walgreens pharmacy chain sponsored the Byrd Antarctic Expedition.

See also 
 List of cultural entities with sole naming rights
 List of sponsored sports venues
 Sponsor (commercial)

References

External links 
 List of American corporate-named sports venues on ESPN.com

Brand management
Place names
Sponsorships
Sports venues
Stadiums